White Cloud Presbyterian Church and Cemetery is a historic Presbyterian church and cemetery located at Fulton, Callaway County, Missouri.  It was built in 1888, and is a one-story, frame gable front church on a limestone foundation.  There are approximately 250 graves in the cemetery dating from about 1840 to the present.

It was listed on the National Register of Historic Places in 2010.

References 

Presbyterian churches in Missouri
Churches on the National Register of Historic Places in Missouri
Churches completed in 1888
Buildings and structures in Callaway County, Missouri
National Register of Historic Places in Callaway County, Missouri